Amr Medhat Mohsen Warda (born 17 September 1993) is an Egyptian professional footballer who plays as a winger or attacking midfielder for Cypriot club Apollon Limassol and the Egypt national team.

Club career

Panetolikos
On 22 August 2015, Warda signed a three-year contract with Panetolikos F.C. on a free transfer from Al Ahly. Panetolikos winger Amr Warda is happy to be rewarded for the Best Goal of the second matchday in the Super League Greece. "I'm very happy that fans voted my goal as the best. I'll try to do my best for me and my team. This goal was important not only for me but for my team too. We proved to be a good team. From my first day in Panetolikos everyone treated me nice. We co-operate and try for the best", Warda said. The attacking midfielder is a transfer target of the big three of Super League, according to his compatriots. On 20 December 2015, he scored the first goal in a 2–0 crucial home win against Iraklis. He was named man of the match.

On 4 March 2016, Warda was called up in Egypt squad ahead of friendly games against Nigeria on 25 and 29 March. On 11 September 2016, he scored his first goal for the 2016–17 season in a 2–1 away loss against PAOK. A week later he scored in a 2–0 away win against rivals Atromitos. On 6 November 2016, he scored the first foal in a 2–1 home win against AEL.

PAOK
On 24 January 2017, Warda signed a 3.5-year contract with PAOK, for an annual fee of €250,000 . He became the seventh Egyptian to play for PAOK after former Egyptian internationals Magdy Tolba, Hossam Hassan, Ibrahim Hassan, Abdel Sattar Sabry, Shikabala and Amir Azmy. The transfer fee is set to €350,000, while Panetolikos kept a 15% future percentage sale. He chose to wear number 7 in Greece and number 74 in European matches. On 23 April 2017, he scored his first Super League goal with PAOK in a 3–1 away win against Platanias Warda, who played the full 90 minutes, scored the opener after four minutes when he shot into the bottom corner following a low cross from the left. On 2 July 2017, according to media, Warda would not follow PAOK's squad in preparation for disciplinary problems and would soon be loaned.

On 9 August 2017, it was announced Warda would be loaned to Feirense. He joined the Portuguese club on a one-year loan deal worth €1.25 million. On 12 August 2017, however, Portuguese media reported Warda would exit Feirense just three days after signing his contract with the club. Record claimed that Warda harassed the wives of two of his teammates. Therefore, besides the players' allegations the Portuguese club was set to terminate the agreement.

Loan to Atromitos
On 29 August 2017, Warda joined Atromitos on a season-long loan. On 23 September 2017, he scored his first goal with the club in a 3–0 home win against Lamia On 16 December 2017, his club beat 3–1 struggling rivals Kerkyra on the road, thanks to a second-half brace by the international midfielder, who named MVP of the game. Warda was named the best playmaker in Greek Super League first round after his displays with Atromitos. Warda scored five goals and assisted twice in 12 outings in the league.

Return to PAOK
In the summer of 2018, Warda returned to PAOK ahead of the 2018–19 season. On 21 August 2018, Warda scored an important away goal in a 1–1 away draw game for UEFA Champions League Playoffs, 1st leg against Benfica.
Warda is set to depart the club with the possibility of returning to Atromitos, where he played on loan last year. A feud between Warda and PAOK manager, Razvan Lucescu saw Warda being dropped from the squad on several occasions.

Second spell in Atromitos
On 24 January 2019, Warda rejoined Atromitos for the rest of the 2018–19 season, with an option to make the transfer permanent. On 16 February 2019, Warda struck to make the score 2–0 as he had the simplest task of tapping the ball into an empty net after a superb run from fellow PAOK loanee Dimitris Chatziisaias ended with him serving up a perfect assist, in a 2–0 away win against PAS Giannina. On 23 February 2019, he equalized the score with a head kick after an assist from Javier Umbides in a 1–1 away draw against Asteras Tripoli.

Loan to AEL
On 30 August 2019, Warda joined AEL on a season-long loan. On 28 September 2019, he scored his first goal with the club, with a header after Ergys Kaçe's corner sealing a 3–2 away win against Aris. On 22 January 2020, scored a brace in a thrilling 2–2 home draw game against Panetolikos F.C., first by a spot-kick to put Larissa back into the match and just six minutes later, with a penalty kick when Frederico Duarte brought down Warda, and the Egyptian international made no mistake for a second time from 11 meters.

Volos
On 28 September 2020, having completed his loan spell at AEL, the 27-year-old has left the White-Blacks for Ángel López Pérez's side. The Egyptian international has joined Volos FC on a year contract for an undisclosed fee. On 17 October 2020, he scored a goal on his debut in a 2–1 win against PAS Giannina.

Third spell to PAOK
On 5 January 2021, after three months at the Panthessaliko Stadium, the Egypt international has returned to Pablo Garcia's squad. Greek Super League side PAOK have announced the re-signing of Egypt international winger Amr Warda on a permanent deal from Volos FC.
On 13 July 2021, Egyptian international Amr Warda was kicked out of PAOK's training by the team head coach Răzvan Lucescu due to disciplinary reasons. Greek reports indicated that Warda didn't finish his training with the team following a disciplinary offense he committed. The team manager Răzvan Lucescu interrupted the training session and refused to disregard the Egyptian's attitude. As a result, Warda was officially expelled of the club, looking the next club of his career.

Anorthosis Famagusta

On 29 August 2021, Anorthosis announced the Egyptian international, on a free transfer for an undisclosed fee. PAOK will keep a 50% resale rate.

Warda was awarded as the MVP of the Cyprus championship at the PASP event for season 2021–22, based on the voting of the A Division football players themselves. The Egyptian winger, in season 2021–22, counted 27 appearances in the league, with 9 goals and 8 assists.

On 21 July 2022, Anorthosis announced the renewal of Warda's contract until 2023.

International career 
On 11 October 2015, Warda made his debut for the Egypt national team in a friendly match against Zambia in Abu Dhabi. His exceptional season year with Panetolikos was his passport to be called by Héctor Cúper to the 30-man provisional 2017 Africa Cup of Nations squad. He helped Egypt reach the final by scoring the last penalty in the semifinals over the Burkina Faso, but the crucial last match ended in a 1–2 defeat by Cameroon.

In May 2018 he was named in Egypt's preliminary squad for the 2018 FIFA World Cup in Russia. On 26 June 2019, Warda was excluded from the national team camp over sexual harassment claims. However, the Egyptian Football Association recalled him to the national team two days later after the player posted an apology video on his official account on Facebook.

Personal life 
He is the son of former international basketball player Mohsen Medhat Warda.

Career statistics

International
.

Harassment Allegations
In 2017: Warda's contract with Portuguese football club CD Feriense was terminated after allegations that he sexually harassed the wives of two of his teammates.

In 2019: Warda alleged to have sent inappropriate messages online. Following allegations that he sexually harassed a number of women, Amr Warda has been expelled from the team's Africa Cup of Nations squad.

Honours

Club
Al Ahly
Egyptian Premier League: 2013–14

PAOK
Super League: 2018–19
Greek Cup: 2016–17, 2018–19, 2020–21

Individual
 Super League Greece Foreign Footballer of the Year: 2017–18
 Super League Greece Player of the Year: 2017–18
 Super League Greece Team of the Year: 2017–18
Cypriot First Division Player of the Year: 2021–22
Cypriot First Division Team of the Year: 2021–22

References

External links

Living people
1993 births
Egyptian footballers
Egyptian expatriate footballers
Egypt youth international footballers
Egypt international footballers
Egyptian Premier League players
Super League Greece players
Al Ahly SC players
Al Ittihad Alexandria Club players
Atromitos F.C. players
Panetolikos F.C. players
PAOK FC players
Athlitiki Enosi Larissa F.C. players
Volos N.F.C. players
Expatriate footballers in Greece
Sportspeople from Alexandria
2017 Africa Cup of Nations players
Association football midfielders
2018 FIFA World Cup players
2019 Africa Cup of Nations players